Glory Days is the fourth studio album by British girl group Little Mix, released on 18 November 2016 by Syco Music and Columbia Records. The group kept to their earlier pop, R&B and dance-pop sound for the album while experimenting more with different styles including tropical house, EDM, and 60s music. It was met with universal acclaim from critics, with lyrics that touch on sexuality, sexual relationships, female solitude, and various topics.

The album's lead single "Shout Out to My Ex", peaked at number-one on the UK Singles Chart, becoming the  group's fourth number one single. It's second single "Touch" reached number four in the UK, while the third single "No More Sad Songs", featuring Machine Gun Kelly, reached number fifteen. It's final single "Power", featuring Stormzy, peaked at number six. Glory Days received 3 Brit Award nominations, and won British Single of the Year at the Brit Awards in 2017. The album was later reissued as Glory Days: The Platinum Edition, which included the single "Reggaetón Lento" with Latin boyband CNCO.

Glory Days showcased the best first-week sales in Little Mix's career so far, selling over 100,000 copies in its first week. It became the fastest-selling number-one album by a girl group in 15 years, and achieved the highest first-week UK album sales for a girl group since 1997.  It also spent five weeks at number one, becoming the longest charting number one album by girl group since 1996, and made Little Mix the eighth girl group in history to land a number one album on the charts. In 2018, it set a new chart record for the most weeks spent inside the top 40 of the UK Albums Chart for a girl group album, spending a total 89 weeks. In 2020 it became the most streamed album by a girl group on Spotify, and the first album by a girl group to reach 2 billion combined streams; earning them a Guinness World Record.

A commercial success, the album peaked at number-one on both of the Irish Albums Chart, and Scottish Albums Chart. It reached the top ten in Australia, New Zealand, Netherlands, and Spain, and charted in other territories including Italy, Germany, and the US, where it reached number twenty five on the US Billboard 200. As of 2017, the album has sold over 1.6 million copies worldwide. It is included on the list of best-selling albums of the 2010s in the United Kingdom.

Singles
"Shout Out to My Ex" was released as the lead single on 16 October 2016, and was premiered on the day of  The X Factor UK results show. It was made available to download along with the pre-order of the album. The song debuted at number one on the UK Singles Chart, remaining at number one for three weeks. The single received two Brit awards nominations, and won gave the group their first Brit Award win, winning British Single of the Year at the 2017 Brit Awards. It also became the second-best selling girl group single released in the United Kingdom, behind "Wannabe", by the Spice Girls. It topped the charts in Ireland, Scotland, Israel, and peaked inside the top ten in both Australia and New Zealand. 

On 5 December, the group announced "Touch" as the second single. It reached number 4 on the UK Singles Chart, and peaked within the top ten of the charts in Ireland and Scotland. It has since been regarded as a gay anthem. On 1 March, "No More Sad Songs" was released as the third single from the album. The new remix of the song featured American hip-hop artist Machine Gun Kelly. Despite minimal promotion, the song charted at number 15 on the UK Singles Chart. 

On 19 May, Little Mix announced through their official Twitter that "Power" would be released as the album's fourth and final official single on 26 May. Two hours after the announcement of the single's release, they announced that the single release of "Power" would be remixed, with an added feature from English grime act Stormzy. The song reached number six on the UK Singles Chart. It has become a female empowerment song and was used as one of the theme songs for WWE's Royal Rumble 2018 event. 

On 24 November 2017, the album was reissued as Glory Days: The Platinum Edition. It featured the single "Reggaetón Lento (Remix)", with CNCO. The single topped the charts in Bulgaria, Sweden, Romania and Slovenia, and reached number five on the UK Singles Chart, becoming CNCO's first top ten single and Little Mix's twelfth. According to Official Charts in 2019, "Shout Out To My Ex" (2) and "Touch" (7) were named two of the biggest girl group singles from the past 25 years.

Promotional singles 
The album was supported by six promotional singles. On 27 October 2016, "You Gotta Not" was released as the first promotional single. The song debuted at number 61 in the UK, 96 in Australia and 88 in Ireland. On 4 November, "F.U." was released as the second promotional single, peaking at number 82 in the UK. "Nothing Else Matters" was released as the third promotional single on 11 November.

"Touch" was released on 15 November, as the fourth promotional single before being announced as the second single of the album. "Nobody Like You" was released as the fifth promotional on 16 November, peaking at number 185 in the UK. The sixth and final promotional single, "Down & Dirty", was released on 17 November, and peaked at number 159 in the UK.

Other songs to make appearances on the UK Singles Charts include "Oops" featuring American singer Charlie Puth. The song peaked at number 41 in the UK and 49 in Ireland. It has been certified Gold by the British Phonographic Industry (BPI) for selling over 400,000 copies in the country. In 2021, it was ranked number-one as the group's biggiest-selling non single in the UK, amassing over 40 million streams.

"Is Your Love Enough" peaked at number 47 in the UK and number 49 in Ireland. It ranks as the group's sixth biggiest-selling non single in the UK.

Promotion
To promote the album the group scheduled promotion campaigns for fans across the UK, Australia, the US, France, Netherlands, Chile, Brazil, Argentina, Belgium, Germany, Norway, Finland and Singapore, called the Glory Days Road Trip. Little Mix also had televised and award show appearances between 2016-2018 to promote the singles from the album across Europe, America, Asia, and Australia. 
Little Mix embarked on The Glory Days Tour in support of the album. It kicked off on May 21, 2017 in Birkenhead, England, and ended on March 25, 2018 in Kobe, Japan, where Little Mix headlined POPSPRING. An estimated 810,000 tickets were sold worldwide and consisted of 70 shows across Oceania, Europe, and Asia.  The tour grossed over $42,000,000 becoming the group's highest-grossing tour to date.

Critical reception

The Guardian called the album "chart pop perfection" and went on to describe the message of the album as "substantial as Girl Power once was". AllMusic stated that Glory Days "finds the group delivering a set of hooky, smartly crafted songs that balance swaggering, '60s-style R&B with stylish, electronic-tinged dance-pop". They also added that "Little Mix's vocal grit and sassy group chemistry make Glory Days such a celebratory album".

In another positive review, Digital Spy wrote, "Little Mix have put together their most personal album yet, without sacrificing big hooks, a mainstream pop sensibility and plenty of sassy attitude." The article continued by saying "Glory Days hears four young women come together with a very real bond, making their message all the more believable." The Evening Standard praised Little Mix for surviving with their fourth studio album, writing "Glory Days mostly sticks to their winning formula", and adding that "the foursome have carved out a pop niche for themselves".

Evening Standard gave the album a positive review stating "the foursome have carved out a pop niche for themselves, so the really rather good You Gotta Not and Oops have a finger-clicking Fifties feel and there’s a hint of edge to the delightfully fierce Power. Little Mix are as fun as pop gets in 2016.

Digital Spy considered Glory Days the 12th best album of the year. Time Out went on to say that the album "has already earned its super-confident title", with the chart-topping single "Shout Out to My Ex" and added that "Little Mix sing brilliantly and sound like they’re having a ball. Long may their glory days continue".

Year-end lists

Commercial performance
Glory Days became Little Mix's first album to top the charts in the United Kingdom, also making them the eighth girl group in history to achieve a number-one and the twenty-fourth number one album to emerge from The X Factor UK. It became one of seven of the 37 albums released that year to top the charts lead by female artists. In its opening week it sold over a 96,000 copies, becoming the fastest-selling album since David Bowie's Blackstar and the second fastest-selling female album of 2016. It had the highest first-week UK album sales for a girl group since Spiceworld in 1997, and became the fastest-selling number-one album by a girl group in 15 years, since Survivor by Destiny's Child in 2001. In its second week it sold 60,000 copies and was certified gold by the British Phonographic Industry (BPI).

Glory Days spent a total of five consecutive weeks at number one in the UK, becoming the longest charting girl group number-one album this millennium since the Spice Girls spent 15 weeks at number one with Spice in 1996. It also set a new chart record for the most weeks spent in the top 40 of the UK Albums chart by a girl group album. All four of the album's singles have been certified platinum or higher by the British Phonographic Industry, making Little Mix the only girl group apart from the Spice Girls to have all singles from one album achieve at least platinum status in the United Kingdom. In 2018, it became the group's first album to surpass a million sales.

The album was ranked as the seventh best-selling album of 2016, the fourth best-selling album of 2017, and the 30th best-selling album of 2018 in the UK by The Official Charts. In 2017 it was also ranked as the sixth biggest album of that year in pure sales and the fifth most streamed album overall.It was the 39th best-selling album of the 2010s, the best-selling album by a girl group during that decade, and the seventh best-selling album by a girl group between 1994 and 2019. It remains as their best-selling album to date in the United Kingdom. In 2019, it also ranked as the sixteenth biggest album by female artists that decade. As of 2022, it has the longest run of any of their albums inside the Official Albums Chart Top 40, spending a total of 89 weeks there. It has since been streamed over 419,000 streams, becoming the group most-streamed album in the country.

The album debut at number one in Ireland, becoming the group's second number one album in the country, while reaching the top spot in Scotland. It peaked in-side the top ten in Australia, Spain, Netherlands, and New Zealand. In the United States, Glory Days, peaked at number 25 on the Billboard 200 and reached the charts in nineteen additional music markets including Japan, Germany, and Canada. As of 2017, Glory Days had sold 1.6 million copies worldwide. and was their first album to be certified triple platinum in the UK. It has since been certified double platinum in Ireland, certified platinum in Brazil and Denmark, and certified gold in Canada, Australia, Mexico, Norway, and Switzerland. In 2018, the album became Little Mix's first album to reach over a billion streams on Spotify, and became the most streamed girl group album on the platform in 2020. At the 2017 Brit Awards, the group received three award nominations for the album's singles, and won British Single of the Year for the album's lead single, "Shout Out to My Ex".

Accolades

Track listing

Notes
  signifies a vocal producer
  signifies an additional producer
 On the digital expanded editions of the album, tracks 22–25 are not included.

Personnel 
Adapted from AllMusic.

 Nils Petter Ankarblom – horn, horn arrangements
 Simon Baggs – violin
 Paul Bailey – assistant engineer
 Tommy Baxter – additional production
 Cory Bice – assistant engineer
 Chris Bishop – engineer, vocal engineer
 Ian Burdge – cello
 Mattias Bylund – editing, horn, mixing
 Johan Carlsson –  guitar programming, piano programming, producer, programming, synthesizer programming, vocal producer, vocals
 Jeremy Coleman –  instrumentation, programming
 Nick Cooper – cello
 Maegan Cottone – arranger,  engineer, vocal producer
 Tom Coyne – mastering
 Cutfather – producer
 Daniel Davidsen – bass programming,  drum programming, guitar programming, instrumental, producer, programming
 Alison Dods – violin
 Electric – engineer, producer
 Uzoechi Emenike – drums, keyboards
 Edvard Førre Erfjord –  instrumentation, programming
 Freedo – additional production, engineer, instrumentation, mixing, producer, programming
 Alice Frost – art direction
 Richard George – violin
 Robert Gerongco –  drums, keyboards, piano
 Sam Gerongco – bass,  guitar
 Serban Ghenea – mixing
 Susie Gillis – string contractor, strings contractor
 Ross Golan –  vocals
 Wojtek Goral – alto saxophone
 Isobel Griffiths – string conductor, string contractor
 John Hanes – mixing engineer
 Mich Hansen –  percussion
 Wayne Hector –  background vocals
 Sam Holland – engineer
 Ash Howes – mixing
 Mark Hunter – photography
 Jeremy Isaac – violin
 J-Mike – producer
 Steve James – producer
 Magnus Johansson – trumpet
 Peter Noos Johansson – trombone
 Joe Kearns – engineer, vocal engineer, vocal producer
 Kuya – producer
 Jeremy Lertola – assistant engineer
 Little Mix – primary artist
 Manny Marroquin – mixing
 Roma Martyniuk – art direction
 Cliff Masterson – conductor, string arrangements
 Laura Melhuish – violin
 Randy Merrill – mastering
 Henrik Michelsen –  instrumentation, programming
 Adam Midgley – additional production, bass, drum programming, keyboards, producer
 Sam Miller – engineer
 MNEK – engineer, producer
 Steve Morris – strings, violin
 Dano Omelio –  engineer, instrumentation, producer, programming
 Noah Passovoy – vocal producer
 Tash Phillips –  background vocals
 Tom Pigott-Smith – strings, violin
 Camille Purcell –  vocals, background vocals
 Charlie Puth –  engineer, featured artist, instrumentation, producer, programming
 Matt Rad – producer
 Alex Reid – vocal engineer
 Steve Robson –  piano, producer
 Shane Shanahan – engineer
 Emlyn Singleton – strings, violin
 Phil Tan – mixing
 Meghan Trainor –  background vocals
 Peter Wallevik –  drum programming, instrumental, piano programming, programmer, programming
 Matthew Ward – violin
 Emily Warren –  background vocals
 Paul Willey – violin
 Bill Zimmerman – assistant, mixing assistant

Charts

Weekly charts

Year-end charts

Decade-end charts

Certifications

Release history

See also
 Lists of UK Albums Chart number ones
 List of UK Albums Chart number ones of the 2010s

References

2016 albums
Albums produced by MNEK
Dance-pop albums by English artists
Little Mix albums
Columbia Records albums
Syco Music albums
Albums produced by TMS (production team)
Albums produced by Johan Carlsson